Glasgow Govan was a parliamentary constituency in the Govan district of Glasgow. It was represented in the House of Commons of the Parliament of the United Kingdom for 120 years; from 1885 until 2005, returning one Member of Parliament (MP) elected by the first-past-the-post system.

It was a Conservative-Liberal marginal seat for the first three decades of its existence, before breaking this trend when the Labour Party won the seat in 1918. It remained a Labour-controlled seat for the next fifty-five years, except for a five-year Conservative interlude between 1950 and 1955, until being seized by the Scottish National Party at a by-election in 1973, only to be regained by Labour the following year. The SNP regained the seat at a 1988 by-election, only to lose it again to Labour in 1992. It remained under Labour control until its abolition thirteen years later.

The area which the constituency represented is now covered by Glasgow Central, Glasgow South and Glasgow South West.

Boundaries
1885–1918: "That part of the parish of Govan which lies south of the Clyde beyond the boundary of the Municipal Burgh of Glasgow".

1918–1945: "That portion of the city which is bounded by a line commencing at a point on the municipal boundary at the centre of the River Clyde in line with the continuation of the centre line of Balmoral Street, thence eastward along the centre line of the River Clyde to a point in line with the continuation of the centre line of the portion of Govan Road to the west of Princes Dock, thence southward to and along the centre line of the said portion of Govan Road, Whitefield Road, Church Road and continuation thereof to the centre, of the Glasgow and Paisley Joint Railway, thence westward along the centre line of the said Glasgow and Paisley Joint Railway to the municipal boundary, thence north-westward, northward, and eastward along the municipal boundary to the point of commencement."

1945–1974: The Glasgow wards of Govan, Kinning Park, part of Fairfield, and part of Kingston.

1974–1983: The Glasgow wards of Fairfield, Govan, Kingston, and Kinning Park.

1983–1997: The City of Glasgow District electoral divisions of Drumoyne/Govan, Mosspark/Bellahouston, and Penilee/Cardonald.

1997–2005: The City of Glasgow District electoral divisions of Govan/Drumoyne, Kingston/Pollokshields, and Langside/Shawlands.

Members of Parliament

Elections

Elections in the 1880s

Pearce's death caused a by-election.

Elections in the 1890s

Elections in the 1900s

Elections in the 1910s

Hunter is appointed Solicitor General for Scotland, prompting a by-election.

Elections in the 1920s

candidature not endorsed by Labour Party HQ

Elections in the 1930s

Maclean had been expelled by the ILP but was endorsed by Labour Party HQ.

Election in the 1940s

Elections in the 1950s

the boundaries of the seat were heavily redrawn and much of the 1950-55 version of Govan ended up in the new Craigton seat

Elections in the 1960s

Elections in the 1970s

Elections in the 1980s

Elections in the 1990s

Elections in the 2000s

References

Bibliography

Historic parliamentary constituencies in Scotland (Westminster)
Constituencies of the Parliament of the United Kingdom established in 1885
Constituencies of the Parliament of the United Kingdom disestablished in 2005
Govan